Športni klub Jadran, commonly referred to as SK Jadran or simply Jadran, was a football club from Ljubljana. The club colours were black and white. After World War II, NK Krim was founded as its successor.

Jadran
Football clubs in Ljubljana
Football clubs in Yugoslavia
1920 establishments in Slovenia
Defunct football clubs in Slovenia